Enrique Rodríguez Castillo (born September 6, 1991), commonly known as Kike Rodríguez, is a Peruvian footballer.

Club career
Rodriguez started his career with a short spell with La Peña Sporting.

On January 28, 2010 it was announced that Rodríguez joined Colegio Nacional Iquitos, the biggest club of Iquitos. Kike made his official debut in the Peruvian First Division in Round 12 of the 2010 season
at home against Cienciano. The manager Marcial Salazar allowed him to start from the beginning of the match, and he was partnered with Marcelo Zamora in the center of defence. He lasted the entire match, and with an early goal from Sergio Almirón the match finished 1–0 in favor of the Iquito's based club.

References

External links

1991 births
Living people
Footballers from Lima
Peruvian footballers
Colegio Nacional Iquitos footballers
Los Caimanes footballers
Comerciantes Unidos footballers
Juan Aurich footballers
FC Carlos Stein players
Association football central defenders